Austin Scott may refer to:
Austin Scott (Rutgers) (1848–1922), Rutgers College president
Austin Scott (politician) (born 1969), American politician and U.S. Representative for Georgia
Austin Wakeman Scott (1886–1981), American legal writer